Roy Sydney George Hattersley, Baron Hattersley,  (born 28 December 1932) is a British Labour Party politician, author and journalist from Sheffield. He was MP for Birmingham Sparkbrook for over 32 years from 1964 to 1997, and served as Deputy Leader of the Labour Party from 1983 to 1992.

Early life
Hattersley was born on 28 December 1932 in Sheffield, West Riding of Yorkshire, to Enid Brackenbury and Frederick Roy Hattersley (1902–1973; also known by his middle name), who married in the 1950s. His mother was a city councillor, and later served as Lord Mayor of Sheffield (1981). His father, at various times a police officer, clerk at Sheffield town hall, and chairman of the council's Health Committee, was a former Roman Catholic priest, the parish priest at St Joseph's at Shirebrook in Derbyshire, who renounced the church and left the priesthood to cohabit with Hattersley's mother, Enid, a married woman at whose wedding he had officiated two weeks earlier; Frederick ultimately died an atheist.

Early political career and education 
Hattersley was a socialist and Labour supporter from his youth, electioneering at the age of 12 for his local MP and city councillors, beginning in 1945. He attended Sheffield City Grammar School passing the 11-plus (locally known as the "scholarship") on his second attempt in 1945 at the age of 12 and went from there to study at the University of Hull. Having been accepted to read English at the University of Leeds, he was diverted into reading Economics at Hull when told by a Sheffield colleague of his mother that it was necessary for a political career.

At university Hattersley joined the Socialist Society (SocSoc) and was one of those responsible for changing its name to the "Labour Club" and affiliating it with the non-aligned International Union of Socialist Youth (IUSY) rather than the Soviet-backed International Union of Students. Hattersley became chairman of the new club and later treasurer, and he went on to chair the National Association of Labour Student Organisations. He also joined the executive of the IUSY.

Member of Parliament
After graduating Hattersley worked briefly for a Sheffield steelworks and then for two years with the Workers' Educational Association. He married his first wife, Molly, who became a headteacher and educational administrator. In 1956 he was elected to the City Council as Labour representative for Crookesmoor and was, very briefly, a JP. On the Council he spent time as chairman of the Public Works Committee and then the Housing Committee.

His aim became a Westminster seat, and he was eventually selected for Labour to stand for election in the Sutton Coldfield constituency but lost to the Conservative Geoffrey Lloyd in 1959. He kept hunting for prospective candidacies, applying for twenty-five seats over three years. In 1963 he was chosen as the prospective parliamentary candidate for the multi-racial Birmingham Sparkbrook constituency (following a well-known local 'character', Jack Webster) and facing a Conservative majority of just under 900. On 16 October 1964 he defeated the Conservative candidate, Michael J. Donnelly, and was elected with a majority of 1,254 votes; he was to hold the seat for the next eight general elections.

Journalist
At first he was Parliamentary Private Secretary to Margaret Herbison, the Minister for Pensions. His maiden speech was on a housing subsidies bill. Still a Gaitskellite, he also joined the 1963 Club. He also wrote his first Endpiece column for The Spectator (the column moved to The Listener in 1979, and then to The Guardian).

Ministerial positions
Despite the support of Roy Jenkins and Tony Crosland he did not gain a ministerial position until 1967, joining Ray Gunter at the Ministry of Labour. He was reportedly disliked by Prime Minister Harold Wilson as a "Jenkinsite". The following year he was promoted to Under Secretary in the same ministry, now led by Barbara Castle, and become closely involved in implementing the unpopular Prices and Incomes Act 1966. In 1969, after the fiasco over In Place of Strife, he was promoted to deputy to Denis Healey, the Minister of Defence, following the death of Gerry Reynolds. One of his first jobs, while Healey was hospitalised, was to sign the Army Board Order – putting troops into Northern Ireland.

European Common Market

The Labour defeat of 1970 ended six years of Labour government. Hattersley was to hold his seat – often increasing his majority – but for the next twenty-six years as MP he was to spend twenty one in Opposition. He was appointed Deputy Foreign Affairs Spokesman, again under Healey, which involved a lot of foreign travel if nothing else. He also took a Visiting Fellowship to the Harvard Kennedy School. During this time he also became an enthusiastic supporter of the Common Market, and his "drift to the political centre" put him at odds with much of the Parliamentary Labour Party (PLP). 

Hattersley was one of the sixty-nine 'rebels' who voted with the Conservative government for entry into the EEC, which precipitated the resignation of Roy Jenkins as deputy leader (10 April 1972) and eventually a permanent split within Labour. (It was the adoption of a referendum on the EEC as shadow cabinet policy that caused Jenkins to resign.) For 'standing by' the party Hattersley was appointed Shadow Defence Secretary 1972 to 1973 and later Shadow Secretary of State for Education.

Privy Council
In the Wilson government of 1974 he was appointed the (non-cabinet) Minister of State for Foreign and Commonwealth Affairs, and in the 1975 New Year Honours, he was sworn of the Privy Council. Hattersley headed the British delegation to Reykjavik during the "Cod Wars", but was primarily given the task of renegotiating the terms of the UK's membership of the EEC. Following the resignation of Wilson he voted for James Callaghan in the ensuing leadership contest to stop Michael Foot (a man "[who] for all his virtues ... could not become Prime Minister"). Under Callaghan he finally made it into the Cabinet as Secretary of State for Prices and Consumer Protection, a position he held until Labour's defeat in the 1979 general election.

In 1979 Hattersley was appointed to shadow Michael Heseltine as the Minister for the Environment, contending with him over the cuts in local government powers and the "Right to Buy". Following the rise of the 'hard left', as demonstrated at the 1980 Labour Conference, Callaghan resigned. The leadership contest was between Healey and Foot, with Hattersley organising Healey's campaign. "An electorate [the PLP] deranged by fear" elected Foot. Healey was made deputy leader and Hattersley was appointed Shadow Home Secretary, but felt that Foot was "a good man in the wrong job", "a baffling combination of the admirable and the absurd". 

Healey was challenged for his post in 1981, following electoral rule changes, by Tony Benn, retaining his post by 50.426% to 49.574%. Hattersley felt that "the Bennite alliance [although defeated] ... played a major part in keeping the Conservatives in power for almost twenty years". Hattersley also had very little regard for those Labour defectors who created the SDP in 1981. He helped found Labour Solidarity (1981–83) and credits the group with preventing the disintegration of the Labour Party.

Deputy Leader
Following Labour's devastating defeat in the 1983 general election Foot declined to continue as leader. Hattersley stood in the subsequent leadership election. John Smith was his campaign manager and a young Peter Mandelson impressed Hattersley. The other competitors were Neil Kinnock, Peter Shore, and Eric Heffer. Hattersley had the support of most of the Shadow Cabinet, but the majority of the PLP, the constituency groups and the unions were in favour of Kinnock. In the final count Kinnock secured around three times as many votes as the second-place Hattersley. As was standard practice at the time, Hattersley was elected deputy leader. The combination was promoted at the time as being a "dream ticket" with Kinnock a representative of the left of the party and Hattersley of the right. Hattersley remained deputy for eight years and also Shadow Chancellor until 1987, when he moved back to Shadow Home Affairs.

Kinnock and Hattersley attempted to "rehabilitate" Labour after 1983. Following the Miners' Strike they resumed expelling members of the entryist Militant group whose activities, organisation and politics had earlier been found to contravene the Labour Party's constitution. In 1988 they fought off a leadership challenge by Tony Benn, Eric Heffer, and John Prescott. Defeat in 1987 was expected; by 1992 it was much more even. Labour had regularly topped opinion polls since 1989 and at one stage had a lead of up to 15 points over the Conservatives, though this was cut back and more than once overhauled by the Tories following the resignation of Margaret Thatcher as prime minister to make way for John Major in November 1990. In the run-up to the 1992 election, Hattersley was present at the Labour Party rally in his native Sheffield and backed up Kinnock with the claim that "with every day that passes, Neil looks more and more like the real tenant of number 10 Downing Street".

Backbenches and retirement
The 1992 general election was held on 9 April 1992, but saw a fourth consecutive Labour defeat by the Conservatives. Kinnock announced his resignation as party leader on 13 April, and on the same day Hattersley announced his intention to resign from the deputy leadership of the party, with the intention of carrying on in their roles until the new leadership was elected that summer. Hattersley supported his friend John Smith in the leadership contest, which Smith won in July that year.

In June 1993, Hattersley cancelled an appearance on TV panel show Have I Got News for You with very late notice, which infuriated the production staff and hosts, leading to Hattersley being replaced with a tub of lard. The programme compared Hattersley and the tub of lard, and claimed "they possessed the same qualities and were liable to give similar performances".

In February 1994, Hattersley announced he would leave politics at the following general election. He was made a life peer as Baron Hattersley, of Sparkbrook in the County of West Midlands on 24 November 1997.

Hattersley was long regarded as being on the right-wing of the party, but with New Labour in power he found himself criticising a Labour government from the left, stating that "Blair's Labour Party is not the Labour Party I joined". He mentioned repeatedly that he would be supporting Gordon Brown as leader.

Hattersley retired from the House of Lords on 19 May 2017.

Later life
In 1996, Hattersley was fined for an incident involving his dog, Buster, after it killed a goose in one of London's royal parks. He later wrote the "diary" of Buster, writing from the dog's perspective on the incident, in which it claimed to have acted in self-defence.

In 2003, Hattersley was elected a Fellow of the Royal Society of Literature. Hattersley is the author of three novels and several biographies. He has written biographies on religious topics, and on the Edwardian period as well. His 700-page biography of David Lloyd George The Great Outsider: David Lloyd George was published by Little, Brown in 2010.

In 2008, Hattersley appeared in a documentary on the DVD for the Doctor Who serial Doctor Who and the Silurians, to discuss the political climate that existed at the time of making the serial. He now writes a regular column for the Daily Mail, "In Search of England", about different parts of the United Kingdom; it normally appears in the paper on Tuesdays.

Personal life
Hattersley married his first wife, the educationalist Molly, in 1956. They divorced in April 2013 after 57 years of marriage, having been separated for five years. They had no children.  In summer 2013, he married Maggie Pearlstine, his literary agent and sister of Norman Pearlstine.

Hattersley supports a British republic. He is a dedicated supporter of Sheffield Wednesday, and a member of the Reform and Garrick clubs.

Partial bibliography
The Catholics: The Church and its people in Britain and Ireland, from the Reformation to the present day (2017) 
David Lloyd George: The Great Outsider, Little Brown (2010) 
Buster's Secret Diaries (2007) 
Campbell-Bannerman (2006)  
The Edwardians: Biography of the Edwardian Age (2004) 
The Life of John Wesley: A Brand from the Burning (2002) 
Buster's Diaries (1999) 
Blood and Fire: William and Catherine Booth and the Salvation Army (1999) 
50 Years on: Prejudiced History of Britain Since the War (1997) 
No Discouragement: An Autobiography (1996) 
Who Goes Home?: Scenes from a Political Life (1995) 
Between Ourselves (1994) 
Skylark's Song (1993) 
In That Quiet Earth (1993) 
The Maker's Mark (1990) 
Choose Freedom: Future of Democratic Socialism (1987) 
A Yorkshire Boyhood (1983) 
 with Eric Heffer, Neil Kinnock and Peter Shore Labour's Choices (1983)
Press Gang (1983) 
Goodbye to Yorkshire (1976)

References

External links

Buster's Diaries official site
Guardian columns by Roy Hattersley
 New Statesman articles by Roy Hattersley
Roy Hattersley, New Statesman, 10 May 2004, 'We should have made it clear that we too were modernisers'
Roy Hattersley and Kevin Hickson Political Quarterly, 8 September 2011,In Praise of Social Democracy

|-

|-

|-

|-

|-

|-

1932 births
20th-century British journalists
Alumni of the University of Hull
British Secretaries of State
Councillors in Sheffield
Daily Mail journalists
English humanists
English male journalists
English republicans
Fellows of the Royal Society of Literature
Harvard Kennedy School staff
Labour Party (UK) MPs for English constituencies
Labour Party (UK) life peers
Living people
Members of the Fabian Society
Members of the Privy Council of the United Kingdom
Ministers in the Wilson governments, 1964–1970
People educated at The City School, Sheffield
People from Wadsley
The Guardian journalists
UK MPs 1964–1966
UK MPs 1966–1970
UK MPs 1970–1974
UK MPs 1974
UK MPs 1974–1979
UK MPs 1979–1983
UK MPs 1983–1987
UK MPs 1987–1992
UK MPs 1992–1997
Shadow Chancellors of the Exchequer
Life peers created by Elizabeth II